Rudy Provoost (born 16 October 1959) is a Belgian businessman and entrepreneur.

Education 
Provoost holds a Master's degree in Psychology from Ghent University (1982), and a Master's degree in Business Management from the Vlerick Business School (1983) in Belgium.

Professional career

Early career
Provoost started his career at Procter & Gamble in 1984, before moving to Canon in 1987.

In 1992, he joined Whirlpool Corporation as Managing Director for Belgium and was later promoted to Vice-President, Consumer Services for Europe (based in Germany). He became Vice-President, Group Sales, Whirlpool Europe, Senior Officer and Member of the Chairman’s Council of Whirlpool Corporation in 1994 (based in Italy). In 1996, Rudy Provoost moved on to become Vice-President, Group Marketing, Europe, and a member of Whirlpool Corporation’s Brand Council. In early 1999, he was promoted to Vice-President, Whirlpool Brand Group, Europe.

Philips
In 2000, Provoost joined Royal Philips to lead the European Philips Consumer Electronics business (based in The Netherlands).

In 2004 he was appointed CEO of Philips Consumer Electronics, and in 2006 became a member of the Management Board of Royal Philips. Under his tenure, the consumer electronics division was restructured  
with a focus on innovation.
 
In 2008, Provoost became CEO of the Philips Lighting division.

Rexel
Provoost joined Rexel in October 2011 and became CEO and Chairman of the Management Board at the beginning of 2012 (based in France).
Shortly after joining Rexel, he announced the “Energy in Motion” company plan.

In May 2013, Rudy Provoost became Chairman of the Rexel Foundation for a better energy future, which was launched under the auspices of the Fondation de France.

In May 2014, Rudy Provoost was named Chairman of the Board of Directors and CEO of Rexel. At the end of June 2016, Rudy Provoost relinquished his positions of Chairman and CEO.

Directorships and publications 

Provoost is the Founder and Managing Director of YquitY, a company delivering advisory, consultancy and business development, investment and management services.

He is currently a Member of the Supervisory Board and the Strategic Committee of Randstad, as well as a Member of the Board of Directors of Elia. He is also a member of the board of directors of the Vlerick Business School.

He was a member of the board of directors of the TCL Corporation (headquartered in China) between 2007 and 2009, and Chairman of the Board of Directors of LG.Philips LCD (later renamed LG Display, headquartered in South Korea) between 2006 and 2008. 
From 2008 until 2010, he was a Member of the Board of the European Federation of Quality Management (EFQM). 
Rudy Provoost also served as President and Chairman of the Executive Board of DIGITALEUROPE (formerly called EICTA, the European Information & Communications Technology Industry Association).

Provoost is a contributing author to the book The balancing act of innovation  as well as the Knowledge@Wharton series.

He is also author of Energy 3.0, a book which discusses the digital transformation of the energy world. The book is published in English and French by Cherche Midi.

References 

1959 births
Belgian businesspeople
Belgian chief executives
Ghent University alumni
Living people
Vlerick Business School alumni